The Euroleague for Life Sciences (ELLS), established in 2001, is a network of leading universities cooperating in the fields of natural resource management, agricultural and forestry sciences, life sciences, veterinary sciences, food sciences, and environmental sciences. ELLS offers summer schools, joint degree programmes, study abroad opportunities and cooperations on PhD level. Every year a member university hosts the ELLS Scientific Student Conference.

Members 
 University of Natural Resources and Life Sciences, Vienna, BOKU
 University of Hohenheim
 University of Copenhagen, Faculty of Science
 Swedish University of Agricultural Sciences
 Wageningen University and Research Centre
 Czech University of Life Sciences Prague
 Warsaw University of Life Sciences

Partners 
 Cornell University, College of Agriculture and Life Sciences
 China Agricultural University
 Hebrew University of Jerusalem, Robert H. Smith Faculty of Agriculture, Food and Environment
 Lincoln University (New Zealand)

References 

College and university associations and consortia in Europe
International scientific organizations based in Europe
Life sciences
Scientific organizations established in 2001